NBT may refer to:

Arts and media
 National Black Theatre, New York, U.S.
 National Black Theatre (Australia) (1972–1977), Sydney, Australia
 Nature Biotechnology, a scientific journal
 Navbharat Times, an Indian newspaper
 Never Been Thawed, a 2005 American film
 The Next BIG Thing, a singing talent contest hosted by Radio Disney
 Nothing But Thieves, a British rock band

Organizations
 National Bank of Tajikistan
 National Book Trust, a publishing house under the Indian Ministry of Education
 National Broadcasting Services of Thailand, formerly Radio Thailand and Television of Thailand
 North Bristol NHS Trust, a hospital group in England.

Transport
 Norbiton railway station, London, National Rail station code

Science and technology
 Natural bobtail, an animal's tail which grows short or is missing
 NetBIOS over TCP/IP, a computer network protocol
 Neurophysiological Biomarker Toolbox, a computing toolbox used in biology
 New Breeding Techniques, a genetic engineering technology
 Nitro blue tetrazolium chloride, a chemical compound used in immunology
 Sodium bismuth titanate, a relaxor ferroelectric material